Deewaangee is a 1976 Hindi film produced by Subodh Mukherjee and directed by Samir Ganguly, the film stars Shashi Kapoor, Zeenat Aman, Ranjeet, Narendra Nath and Helen. The film's music is composed by Ravindra Jain and Sachin Dev Burman and the lyrics by Anand Bakshi, Ravindra Jain and Naqsh Lyallpuri.

Plot
This is the story of a woman who protects her family, after losing their property and money and the story of a man who thinks money is everything.

Cast
Shashi Kapoor - Shekhar
Zeenat Aman - Kanchan
Ranjeet - Harry
Helen - Kitty
Mehmood Jr. - Birju
Madan Puri - George
Raju Shrestha - Baabla
Narendra Nath - Munne Khan
Manju Asrani - Ruby
Viju Khote - Shekhar's friend
Raj Kishore - Stage actor
Sujata  
Paresh Nanda  
Ranvir Raj  
Nawab

Soundtrack

External links
 
 Deewaangee on YouTube, Rajshri Productions

1970s Hindi-language films
Films scored by S. D. Burman
Films scored by Ravindra Jain
Films directed by Samir Ganguly